The Anglican Church of St Michael and All Angels at Rowberrow within the English county of Somerset dates from the 14th century, but parts were rebuilt in 1865. It is a Grade II* listed building.

History

The church was originally built in the 14th century. The nave, chancel and porch underwent Victorian restoration and rebuilding work in 1865.

The parish is part of the benefice of Axbridge with Shipham and Rowberrow within the Diocese of Bath and Wells.

Architecture

In addition to the two-bay nave and chancel there is a three-stage west tower. Inside the floor of the church is encaustic tiles. There is a font dating from the 14th century which is topped by a Jacobean cover. The fragment of a Saxon cross carved on the north wall of the chancel is a symbol of the link between royalty, local landowners and the church.

See also  
 List of ecclesiastical parishes in the Diocese of Bath and Wells

References

Grade II* listed buildings in Sedgemoor
Grade II* listed churches in Somerset